Lahti Basketball is a Finnish basketball club based in Lahti. It plays in the Korisliiga, the highest tier league in Finland. A phoenix club, the club was established in 2015 as a successor of Namika Lahti. Martin Mustonen and Kari Härkönen, also active with Namika, founded the club in August. Finnish international Vesa Mäkäläinen transferred from Namika to the new club.

In the 2018–19 season, Lahti Basketball promoted to the Finnish first tier Korisliiga.

References

External links
Official website
Facebook page

Basketball teams established in 2015
Basketball teams in Finland
Lahti
2015 establishments in Finland